Paul-Émile Côté (9 September 1909 – 3 June 1970) was a Liberal party member of the House of Commons of Canada. He was born in Montreal, Quebec and became a lawyer by career.

He was first elected at the Verdun riding in the 1940 general election then re-elected there in 1945. With the riding changed to Verdun—La Salle, he was re-elected again in 1949 and in 1953 when his riding reverted to the Verdun name. Côté resigned his seat at the end of 1953 to accept an appointment as a Quebec Superior Court judge. Yves Leduc, also a Liberal, succeeded Côté at Verdun in a March 1954 by-election.

References

External links
 

1909 births
1970 deaths
Judges in Quebec
Lawyers from Montreal
Liberal Party of Canada MPs
Members of the House of Commons of Canada from Quebec
Politicians from Montreal